Falling for a Dancer is an Irish  1998 romantic drama television movie set in rural Ireland in the 1930s. It first aired on BBC One in four 50-minute episodes on 13 September 1998.

Plot
Set in 1930s Cork, nineteen-year-old  Elizabeth has a brief fling with a young actor and dancer and becomes pregnant. With no chance of finding the father, and trying to avoid entering the Magdalene Laundries, she chooses to marry an older man who she first meets on her wedding day and moves to her new life in West Cork. The series follows Elizabeth through this marriage and her new life on a farm in West Cork.  It is here Elizabeth has her baby but her choice of marriage has its darker side; resentment from her step children, moments of tragedy and a longing for young love and passion that she does not get from her husband, Neeley.

Production
It was filmed in Beara, County Cork on the southwest coast.

Cast
 Elisabeth Dermot Walsh as Elizabeth 
 Dermot Crowley as Neeley Scollard
 Liam Cunningham as Mossie Sheehan
 Rory Murray as George
 Maureen O'Brien as Corinne Sullivan
 Brian McGrath as St. John Sullivan 
 Colin Farrell as Daniel McCarthey

External links
  
 

1998 British television series debuts
1998 British television series endings
1990s British drama television series
BBC television dramas
1990s British television miniseries
Television shows based on Irish novels
English-language television shows
Television series set in the 1930s
British romantic drama films
Television shows set in the Republic of Ireland
British drama television films

}